Qarah Bolagh-e Miankuh (also Romanized as Qarah Bolāgh-e Mīānkūh and Qareh Bolāgh-e Mīānkūh; also known as Qareh Bolāgh) is a village in Siyah Mansur Rural District, in the Central District of Bijar County, Kurdistan Province, Iran. At the 2006 census, its population was 59, in 15 families. The village is populated by Kurds.

References 

Towns and villages in Bijar County
Kurdish settlements in Kurdistan Province